Bloody Dick Creek is a stream in Beaverhead County, Montana, in the United States.

It was apparently named in honor of a man who settled nearby in the 1860s.

Bloody Dick Creek is noted for trout fishing. A single cabin is available at Bloody Dick Creek for rental year-round from the United States Forest Service.

See also
List of rivers of Montana

References

Rivers of Beaverhead County, Montana
Rivers of Montana